The Voice of the Child is a 1911 American drama film directed by D. W. Griffith and starring Blanche Sweet. The film was made by the American Mutoscope and Biograph Company when it and many other early film studios in America's first motion picture industry were based in Fort Lee, New Jersey at the beginning of the 20th century.

Cast
 Edwin August as The Husband
 Blanche Sweet as The Wife
 Adele DeGarde as The Child
 Joseph Graybill as The False Friend
 Kate Bruce

See also
 D. W. Griffith filmography
 Blanche Sweet filmography

References

External links

1911 films
Films directed by D. W. Griffith
American silent short films
1911 drama films
1911 short films
Biograph Company films
American black-and-white films
Films shot in Fort Lee, New Jersey
Silent American drama films
1910s American films